Slander is a 1957 American drama film directed by Roy Rowland and starring Van Johnson and Ann Blyth.

Plot
Scandal magazine editor and publisher H. R. Manley spares nobody in his efforts to sell more of his tabloid publication, "The Real Truth" (a thinly veiled substitute for Confidential Magazine) making a fortune for the past two years but appalling his mother with his methods.

Despite his success, Manley owes $100,000 to the magazine's printer. He needs a hot topic to stimulate sales and decides that a scandalous story about movie star Mary Sawyer will do the trick. Following a lead, Manley discovers that Sawyer has a damaging secret known to no one but a long-time friend, a Scott Martin.

Scott is a puppeteer who has just started his own hugely successful children's entertainment show on TV. It is the first big break of his career, an exciting time for his wife, Connie, and their son, Joey as well. Scott has a secret of his own, however; Manley discovers that he once served four years in prison for an armed robbery.

Connie already is aware of her husband's past and explains why it happened, but Manley doesn't care. If he doesn't get the damaging information about Mary Sawyer in time for the magazine's next edition, he will ruin Scott's television career by exposing his criminal past.

Her fear and unhappiness about their future being destroyed getting the better of her, Connie implores her husband to betray Mary, putting his own family's needs first. Scott at first wavers, then flatly refuses and Connie leaves him. Scott becomes oblivious to Manley's threats now, his personal life already in ruins. Misery becomes tragedy when the boy, Joey, taunted at school, runs into the street and is hit by a car and killed, just as Connie was coming to bring him home to Scott.

Manley's mother goes to Connie to confirm her son's connection with Joey's death. Scott appears on a television show and tells the viewers about Joey. Watching the program, with his mother, Manley calls a colleague to say this will boost the magazine's sales even more. His mother removes a gun from a drawer and kills her own son. Seth tells Scott the magazine is in trouble. Maybe if enough people act, this will be the end of this kind of poison. “Maybe,” Scott says with no enthusiasm, “Maybe”.

Cast
 Van Johnson as Scott Martin
 Ann Blyth as Connie Martin
 Steve Cochran as H. R. Manley
 Marjorie Rambeau as Mrs. Manley
 Richard Eyer as Joey
 Harold J. Stone as Seth
 Philip Coolidge as Homer Crowley
 Malcom Atterbury as Byron (uncredited) 
 Robert Burton as Harry Walsh (uncredited)
 Jonathan Hole as Cereal Company Executive (uncredited)
 Dean Jones as Newscaster (uncredited)
 Harry Tyler as Willis (uncredited)
 Irene Tedrow as Marion Gregg (uncredited)

Reception
The film was released January 12, 1957 in the United States. According to MGM records, the film earned $370,000 in the US and Canada and $375,000 elsewhere, making a loss to the studio of $535,000.

See also
List of American films of 1957

References

External links
 
 

1957 films
Metro-Goldwyn-Mayer films
1957 drama films
American drama films
1950s English-language films
1950s American films